Chameli Devi Das is a Nepalese politician. She is a member of the Provincial Assembly of Madhesh Province from People's Socialist Party, Nepal. Das is a resident of Lakshminiya Rural Municipality, Dhanusha.

References

Living people
1977 births
Madhesi people
21st-century Nepalese women politicians
21st-century Nepalese politicians
Members of the Provincial Assembly of Madhesh Province
People's Socialist Party, Nepal politicians